Kuhn Island is an island in Franz Josef Land, Arkhangelsk Oblast, Russia.

Geography 

Kane Island lies to the east. All three islands are separated from the larger Greely Island to the south by the Sternek Strait (Russian: пролив Штернека).

History 

The island was discovered by the Austro-Hungarian North Pole expedition in 1874 and was named in honour of the Austro-Hungarian minister of war Franz Kuhn von Kuhnenfeld, a patron of Julius Payer, one of the expedition's leaders.

See also 

 Franz Josef Land
 List of islands of Russia

References

External links 

 Kuhn Island (Ostrov Kuna) - Franz Josef Land on www.franz-josef-land.info

Islands of Franz Josef Land
Uninhabited islands of Russia